Daniil Aleksandrovich Belotserkovskiy (born 24 July 1994) is a former Russian football midfielder.

Club career
He made his debut in the Russian Football National League for FC Khimki on 30 May 2011 in a game against FC Alania Vladikavkaz.

References

External links
 
 

1994 births
Living people
Russian footballers
Association football midfielders
FC Khimki players